Trifurcula macedonica is a moth of the family Nepticulidae. It was described by A. and Z. Laštuvka in 1998. It is known from Negotino, North Macedonia.

References

Nepticulidae
Moths of Europe
Moths described in 1998